Hartridge Hill is an elongated, peat hill situated in the Luppitt catchment area of East Devon, England.  Mostly privately owned and primarily used for farming this is, with a peak rising  asl, one of the highest spots in the Otter Valley. At its highest and most southerly point there is a tumulus or burial mound.

At its most southerly point lies the hamlet of Beacon.

Hills of Devon